The Furman Paladins men's soccer team is a varsity intercollegiate athletic team of Furman University in Greenville, South Carolina, United States. The team is a member of the Southern Conference, which is part of the National Collegiate Athletic Association's Division I. Furman's first men's soccer team was fielded in 1967. The team plays its home games at Eugene Stone Stadium in Greenville. The Paladins are coached by Doug Allison.

Coaching history 
Furman has had four head coaches in program history.

Individual achievements

All-Americans 

Furman has produced 10 All-Americans.

References

External links 
 

 
1967 establishments in South Carolina